197 (one hundred [and] ninety-seven) is the natural number following 196 and preceding 198.

In mathematics
 197 is a prime number, the third of a prime quadruplet: 191, 193, 197, 199
 197 is the smallest prime number that is the sum of 7 consecutive primes: 17 + 19 + 23 + 29 + 31 + 37 + 41, and is the sum of the first twelve prime numbers: 2 + 3 + 5 + 7 + 11 + 13 + 17 + 19 + 23 + 29 + 31 + 37
 197 is a centered heptagonal number, a centered figurate number that represents a heptagon with a dot in the center and all other dots surrounding the center dot in successive heptagonal layers
 197 is a Schröder–Hipparchus number, counting for instance the number of ways of subdividing a heptagon by a non-crossing set of its diagonals.

In other fields
 197 is also:
 A police emergency telephone number in Tunisia
 Number enquiry  telephone number in Nepal
 a song by Norwegian alternative rock group Major Parkinson from their self-titled debut album

See also
 The year AD 197 or 197 BC
 List of highways numbered 197

References

Integers